Metodi Khalvadzhiski (born 26 April 1949) is a Bulgarian rower. He competed in the men's coxless four event at the 1972 Summer Olympics.

References

1949 births
Living people
Bulgarian male rowers
Olympic rowers of Bulgaria
Rowers at the 1972 Summer Olympics
Rowers from Sofia